A total solar eclipse occurred on June 24, 1778. A solar eclipse occurs when the Moon passes between Earth and the Sun, thereby totally or partly obscuring the image of the Sun for a viewer on Earth. A total solar eclipse occurs when the Moon's apparent diameter is larger than the Sun's, blocking all direct sunlight, turning day into darkness. Totality occurs in a narrow path across Earth's surface, with the partial solar eclipse visible over a surrounding region thousands of kilometres wide.

The total eclipse was visible in a path across Mexico, southeastern United States, and ended across northern Africa.

Observations 

This was the first total solar eclipse recorded in the United States. The track passed from Lower California to New England. According to Thomas Jefferson, the eclipse was clouded out in Virginia. General George Rogers Clark and his men observed the eclipse as they passed over the Falls of the Ohio on their way to take Kaskaskia during the Illinois Campaign, regarding it as a good omen. U.S. troops marching south through Georgia in an abortive attempt to invade British East Florida also subsequently recorded the event. This solar eclipse lasted four minutes over the middle Atlantic and New England States.

Saros 133

Notes

References

 NASA graphic
 Googlemap
 NASA Besselian elements
 
 The Solar Corona in the Eclipse of 24 June 1778 Solar Physics: Volume 216, Numbers 1–2 / September, 2003

1778 6 24
1778 in science
1778 6 24